Cregg Mill may refer to:

Cregg Mill, County Galway, Ireland
Cregg Mill, Isle of Man, historic site among Registered Buildings and Conservation Areas of the Isle of Man